Ferenc Kemény (17 July 1860, in Nagybecskerek, now Zrenjanin, Serbia – 21 November 1944, in Budapest) was a Hungarian educator and humanist, whose international recognition degree was established as a founding member of the International Olympic Committee and his role in the contemporary peace movement.

Life
The original family name was Kohn and he was Jewish. He graduated from his school in Budapest, where he started studying for a Lehramt. He went to Stuttgart, also to improve his German language skills. In 1883 he received the Lehramtsdiplom for mathematics and physics at the University of Budapest.

In 1884, he went to Paris to attend lectures at the Collège de France and the Sorbonne, mainly to deepen the French language. In student circles, he met Pierre de Coubertin. As an educator, Kemény was impressed by Coubertin's basic idea, a sport-based reform of education. But he was still occupied with the early peace movement, for which Paris was at that time one of the centers.

According to sources of the Hungarian National Olympic Committee, Kemény, who, in addition to the educational effect of sport, saw the possibility of using the sport for the peace movement, and therefore, during his stay in Paris, had submitted to Coubertin the Antique revival of the Olympic Games. Kemény and Coubertin combined a lifelong friendship; So they remained in constant contact with each other, after Kemény's return to Hungary, 1888.

During his time as a teacher in the Hungarian provinces, Kemény acquired diplomas for German and French. In 1890 he took a teaching position in Eger, where he was later appointed Deputy Director. Kemény, who has since become known through publications on the modernization of the education system, met with resistance for the first time in conservative aristocratic circles.

At the beginning of 1894, Kemény received a letter from Coubertin, who invited him to an international sports congress in the same year at the Sorbonne in Paris, which was later to be known as the first Olympic Congress. Immediately, Kemény sought support from the Ministry of Culture and Education in his home country. However, the policy of the Austro-Hungarian monarchy dictated cautious action in international affairs Thus, Kemény received no official support and no financial support, but he was given a free hand. A trip to Paris was not possible for him, but it was not surprising that Coubertin, however, was still a member of the International Olympic Committee, which was founded on June 23, 1894, the last day of the congress.

Kemény was an enthusiastic advocate of the Olympic movement. He immediately sought the formation of a committee for the posting of Hungarian athletes to the first Olympic Games in Athens in 1896. On 19 December 1895, the National Olympic Committee of Hungary was established, in which Kemény took over the role of secretary.

His views on the Olympic movement were marked by peace. He regarded the Olympics as a symbol of the international peace movement, and regarded them as a celebration that should be one of the happiest, most peaceful and fraternal movements of world youth. This attitude was characteristic of Kemény's work for peace, which he held as the 26th member of the International Peace Office, as a member of the board and first secretary of the Hungarian Peace Association, and as Secretary General of the World Peace Congress in Budapest in 1896.

The ongoing disputes over the financing of the Olympic Games in Athens prompted Kemény to move to Budapest, where in 1896 the celebrations for the 1000-year settlement history of the Magyars were held. After all, the games remained in Athens, and Kemény led the small Hungarian delegation on behalf of the Hungarian government. He also took part in numerous meetings of the IOC. His publications after the Games attracted great attention and made Kemény a person who was respected in political circles.

The intense efforts of Kemény around the Olympic movement, however, did not achieve an undivided acceptance throughout Hungary. Again, it was the aristocratic circles, in particular, who did not regard Kemény as the appropriate representative in the IOC because of their bourgeois background. In 1907, he resigned from the Hungarian Olympic Committee.

As a friend of peace, Kemény was unsuccessfully nominated Emperor and King Franz Joseph I for the Nobel Peace Prize for 1908, 1913 and 1914.

Kemény subsequently devoted himself exclusively to educational studies. In 1934 he was co-editor of the Encyclopaedia of Pedagogy. During the Second World War, Kemény became a victim because of his Jewish descent. He escaped the threat of deportation by committing suicide with his wife in the cellar of his apartment in 1944.

On 1 June 1980 a new sports hall was built in Eger, named after him.

References

External links

1860 births
1944 suicides
International Olympic Committee members
People from Zrenjanin
Hungarian Jews
Suicides in Hungary
Joint suicides
Suicides by Jews during the Holocaust